Portlandia is a genus of flowering plants in the coffee family, Rubiaceae. Members of the genus are endemic to Jamaica.

Species
, Plants of the World Online accepted the following species:
Portlandia coccinea Sw.
Portlandia grandiflora L.
Portlandia harrisii Britton
Portlandia microsepala Urb.
Portlandia platantha Hook.f.
Portlandia proctorii (Aiello) Delprete

Formerly placed here
Portlandia albiflora Britton & Harris ex Standl. = Portlandia platantha Hook.f.
Portlandia domingensis Britton = Cubanola domingensis (Britton) Aiello
Portlandia hexandra Jacq. = Coutarea hexandra (Jacq.) K.Schum.
Portlandia pterosperma S.Watson = Hintonia latiflora (DC.) Bullock
Portlandia speciosa Baill. =  Coutarea hexandra (Jacq.) K.Schum.

References

External links

 
Rubiaceae genera